The 2017 Karachi floods in Karachi have killed at least 23 people, mostly from electrocution. According to the Pakistan Meteorological Department, the flood is caused by the monsoon rain which began on 28-08-2017 Wednesday evening. As the incident took place, the Army and Navy, along with other welfare organizations, started rescuing people.

See also
 2017 South Asian floods
 2009 Karachi floods

References 

2017 disasters in Pakistan
Floods in Pakistan
2010s in Karachi
2017 floods in Asia
August 2017 events in Pakistan
2017 South Asian floods